Maria Lucilene Silva is a road cyclist from Brazil. She represented her nation at the 2004 UCI Road World Championships.

References

External links
 profile at Procyclingstats.com

Brazilian female cyclists
Brazilian road racing cyclists
Living people
Place of birth missing (living people)
Year of birth missing (living people)